The Bohinj Railway is a railway in Slovenia and Italy. It connects Jesenice in Slovenia with Trieste in Italy. It was built by Austria-Hungary from 1900 to 1906 as a part of a new strategic railway, the Neue Alpenbahnen, that would connect Western Austria and Southern Germany with the then Austro-Hungarian port of Trieste. The line starts in Jesenice, at the southern end of the Karawanks Tunnel; it then crosses the Julian Alps through the Bohinj Tunnel, and passes the border town of Nova Gorica before crossing the Italian border and reaching Trieste.

During the First World War, it carried the majority of Austrian military supplies to the Isonzo Front. Due to new political divisions in Europe, with the dissolution of Austria-Hungary into separate states in 1918 and the isolation of communist Yugoslavia after 1945, the railway decreased in importance during the twentieth century. However, Slovenia's accession to the European Union has created new prospects for the railway as a convenient passenger and freight route from Central and Eastern Europe to the port of Trieste.

Names
 The Slovenian name for the railway is Bohinjska proga (Bohinj railway), referring to both the valley and the town of Bohinj.
 The German name for it is Wocheiner Bahn (the German name of Bohinj); the southern part of the railway, beyond Nova Gorica, has also been known as the Karstbahn. At the time of construction, the official designation was Karawanken- und Wocheinerbahn, in reference to the Karawanks railway from which it originates in Jasenice: together with it and the Tauern Railway (Tauernbahn), it formed the New Alpine Railways project (Neue Alpenbahnen).
 In Italian, the railway is known as the Ferrovia Transalpina (the Cross-Alps Railway), and that name is still used for the Italian services between Gorizia and Trieste.

History

The political decision
In 1869, the Trieste Chamber of Commerce had sent a petition to the Emperor Franz Joseph, in which they argued that the opening that year of the Suez Canal would indubitably lead to further development of Trieste, the main port of the Austro-Hungarian Empire; therefore, a second railway line to Vienna or the northern parts of Austria would be needed to support increased maritime traffic, in addition to the existing Austrian Southern Railway. The discussion regarding the path that new railway would take was however not easily settled, and would actually lead to a "nearly thirty year long war".

Only by 1901 was this dispute settled. On 12 February of that year, the Minister for Railway Affairs of Austria Heinrich Ritter von Wittek brought a bill to the attention of the Imperial Council (the Austrian parliament) for the construction of new railways and public investment in them. After approval by both chambers, the Emperor signed the bill into law on 6 June 1901.

Among other provisions, the law provided that the Karawanks and Wocheiner (now Bohinj) railways should be built by 1905 as main lines of the first rank. The cost of that railway was estimated at 103.6 million Kronen, by far the most expensive railway project in the law. That cost would be covered by the issue of government bonds.

To overhaul such a large project, the Minister named a Construction Director directly subordinate to him, the engineer Karl Wurmb. In 1905, both Minister Wittek and Wurmb would be subjected to parliamentary critic regarding the cost overruns incurred by the construction due to geological difficulties.

Operation until 1945
After the First World War, the railway was separated to Yugoslavia and Italy as a result of the Treaty of Versailles. The border had been located in the middle of the Bohinj tunnel; Italy obtained the whole area of the Isonzo valley. In Italy, the new Solkan bridge was reconstructed in its original form. The segment Villa Opicina–Trieste was until 1936 electrified with the 3000 V direct current.

Operation since 1945
In 1945, the border between Italy and Yugoslavia moved in the western direction; most parts of the Isonzo valley then belonged to Yugoslavia. Until 1948, the branch line Kreplje–Sežana was constructed, at the side of Sežana, it is connected to the historical Austrian Southern Railway. This connection enables the traffic between the Southern Railway and this line to avoid Italian territory altogether. Due to the political isolation in Europe, the Bohinj Railway lost its importance from 1945 to 1990.

After the opening of the Koper Railway in 1967, the transport was processed from the port Koper through the Karst Railway and this line into Germany or Austria. After the earthquake in Friuli in 1976, it was used as a detour for express trains. Since the beginning of the 1990er years, the rail transport has been mostly executed via Pivka and Ljubljana, which causes the Soča corridor to decline significantly.

The accession of Slovenia and other states to the European Union in 2004 and to the Schengen area at the end of 2007 significantly accelerated rail traffic from large parts of Europe to the ports of Trieste and Koper, which are conveniently located especially for the Czech Republic, southern Germany, Slovakia, Austria, and Hungary, by abolishing border controls.

See also
Transalpina/Europe Square

References

Literature 
  
 .
  
 
 .

External links

Railway lines in Friuli-Venezia Giulia
Railway lines in Slovenia
International railway lines
Strategic railways
Railway lines opened in 1906
1906 establishments in Austria-Hungary